According to the Kalenjin social system, the male sex is divided into boys, warriors and elders. The female sex is divided into girls and married women. The first stage began at birth and continued till initiation.

These age sets played a significant role in traditional Kalenjin society since they were used to record time. Once the young men of a particular  came of age, they were tasked with protecting the tribal lands and the society, the period when they were in charge of protection of the society was known as the age of that .

The age of an  sometimes acquired a nickname based on a defining event occurring during their time.

Age set Names

– *La Fontaine states there are eight "age classes" but lists seven names, the order of which is questionable.

Marakwet
There are corresponding female age-sets among the Marakwet; for example, Kaberur (male) – Chemeri/ Chemeri Kipchesum (female), Kaplelach (male)- Tabesit / Tabesit Ruompo Laikok (female), Kipnyikew/ Kipmke (male)- Silingwa (female), Nyongi (male)- Kaptura (female), Maina (male) – Charkina (female), Chumo (male) – Kipturbei (female), Sowe (male)- Chelyong/ Kapcheusi (female), Korongoro (male)- Cheptentur/ Sikinkin/ Kesengen (female). The Marakwet still circumcise girls alongside boys. However, the naming of female age-sets changes according to prevailing events.

Nandi
Legend has it that the members of this ibinda were wiped out in war. For fear of a recurrence, the community decided to retire the age-set.

The order of Nandi  is given below. 

 Maina
 Chumo
 Sawe
 Kipkoimet
 Kaplelach
 Kipnyigei
 Nyongi

Age sub-set (siritiet)

In each age-set, the initiates were bundled into  or what can be understood as a 'team'.
 Chongin
 Kiptaito
 Tetagaat (literally cow's neck)
 Kiptaruiyeek - Kiptoiinik (literally young calves)

References

Kalenjin